Elymnias papua is a butterfly in the family Nymphalidae. It was described by Alfred Russel Wallace in 1869. It is endemic to New Guinea in the Australasian realm.

Subspecies
E. p. papua (West Irian - Southeast New Guinea)
E. p. lactentia  Fruhstorfer, 1907 (Waigiou)
E. p. cinereomargo  Joicey & Noakes, 1915 (Biak)
E. p. bivittata  van Eecke, 1915 (New Guinea)

References

External links
"Elymnias Hübner, 1818" at Markku Savela's Lepidoptera and Some Other Life Forms

Elymnias
Butterflies described in 1869
Butterflies of Oceania
Taxa named by Alfred Russel Wallace
Endemic fauna of New Guinea